Wardrecques is a commune in the Pas-de-Calais department in the Hauts-de-France region of France.

Geography
Wardrecques is located 6 miles (9 km) southeast of Saint-Omer, on the D199 road, just a hundred yards from the Neufossé Canal.

Population

Places of interest
 The church of Notre-Dame, dating from the sixteenth century.
 The eighteenth century Quenivet  chapel.

See also
Communes of the Pas-de-Calais department

References

Communes of Pas-de-Calais